The Lawa is a river of South America. It forms part of the international boundary between Suriname and French Guiana. It is formed by the confluence of the Litani and Malani. Downstream from its confluence with the Tapanahony, it is called Maroni. Important tributaries are the Tampok, Inini and Grand Abounami.

After gold was discovered on the banks of the Lawa River, the governor of Suriname, Cornelis Lely, ordered the construction of the Lawa Railway in 1902. Construction of the railway line was halted when gold production in the area proved disappointing.

See also
List of rivers of Suriname
List of rivers of French Guiana

References
Rand McNally, The New International Atlas, 1993.

Rivers of Suriname
Rivers of French Guiana
French Guiana–Suriname border
International rivers of South America
Rivers of France
Border rivers